Instinct is the inherent disposition of a living organism toward a particular behavior.

Animal instinct(s) may also refer to:

Music
 Animal Instinct (Tygers of Pan Tang album), 2008
 Animal Instinct (Gary Hoey album), 1993
 "Animal Instinct" (Annemarie Eilfeld song), 2010
 "Animal Instinct" (Cranberries song), 1999
 "Animal Instinct", a song by Mobb Deep from the album Hell on Earth
"Animal Instincts", a song by Kajagoogoo, from the album White Feathers

Film and television
Animal Instincts (film), a 1992 thriller-drama film
 "Animal Instincts" (The Green Green Grass), an episode of the BBC sitcom The Green Green Grass